Jakub Bart-Ćišinski (20 August 1856 in Kuckau – 16 October 1909 in Panschwitz), also known as Łužičan, Jakub Bart Kukowski, was Sorbian poet, writer and playwright, translator of Czech, Polish, Italian and German literature. He produced his works in Upper Sorbian. He is also an inventor of modern Upper Sorbian poetic language. He has been described as "the classical writer of Sorbian literature."

As a Sorbian writer, he felt that writing the Sorbian language and using it for literature and for education would be important for preserving the vitality and distinctiveness of Sorbian culture. But he also realized that it was a double-edged sword, in that education would reduce the isolation of Sorbian culture, making it more vulnerable to outside (mostly German) influence.

Citations

References

See also

 List of Sorbian-language writers

1856 births
1909 deaths
People from Bautzen (district)
People from the Kingdom of Saxony
Sorbian-language writers
German male writers
Writers from Saxony